Outlaw Gold is a 1950 American Western film directed by Wallace Fox and written by Jack Lewis. The film stars Johnny Mack Brown, Jane Adams, Milburn Morante, Hugh Prosser, Marshall Reed and Myron Healey. The film was released on November 20, 1950, by Monogram Pictures.

Plot
U.S. Marshall Dave Willis (Johnny Mack Brown) and Sandy Barker (Milburn Morante), traveling incognito to investigate the robbery of a shipment of Mexican Government gold, rescue Kathy Martin (Jane Adams) from an outlaw ambush, after her father Joel Martin (Steve Clark), publisher of the Latigo newspaper, has been wounded. Later, Martin is killed, and Bull Jackson (Marshall Reed), who claims to have seen the crime, accuses Dave of the murder.

Cast          
Johnny Mack Brown as Dave Willis
Jane Adams as Kathy Martin
Milburn Morante as Sandy Barker
Hugh Prosser as Roger Bigsby
Marshall Reed as Bull Jackson
Myron Healey as Sonny Lang
Steve Clark as Joel Martin
Bud Osborne as Sheriff Doss
George DeNormand as Whitey

References

External links
 

1950 films
American Western (genre) films
1950 Western (genre) films
Monogram Pictures films
Films directed by Wallace Fox
American black-and-white films
1950s English-language films
1950s American films